Françoise Bonetat (born March 27, 1944) is a French sprint canoer who competed in the late 1970s. She was eliminated in the repechages of the K-1 500 m event at the 1976 Summer Olympics in Montreal.

References

1944 births
Canoeists at the 1976 Summer Olympics
French female canoeists
Living people
Olympic canoeists of France